The Christ Church of Lower Kickapoo, also known as Christ Church Limestone or the Old Stone Church, is in Limestone Township, Peoria County, Illinois near Norwood, Illinois.  It is included in the National Register of Historic Places of the United States.

History 
The congregation began at what is now Norwood (formerly Jones Hollow), by English and Welsh immigrants in 1834. Philander Chase, the first Bishop of the Diocese of Illinois, accepted the congregation into the Diocese informally in early Fall of 1836. The parish was formally received into the Diocese of Illinois in 1838. At this time, services were still held in parishioners' homes.

The church was constructed by church members primarily from local materials in the architectural style of their homelands. The cornerstone was laid on May 17, 1844 and the finished structure was consecrated on December 10, 1845. Limestone for the construction was quarried from a nearby creek and the gated pews were hewn from local walnut. By way of a letter writing campaign directed to Queen Adelaide, Queen Victoria is considered a donor towards the cost of the construction of the primary building. As a result, the church bell was donated for her Silver Jubilee celebration in 1887. The bell tower was constructed in 1889.

Formerly an Episcopal congregation, Christ Church Limestone is now a member of the Anglican Church, Diocese of Quincy.

References

Churches completed in 1845
1840s establishments in Illinois
Churches in Peoria County, Illinois
Churches on the National Register of Historic Places in Illinois
National Register of Historic Places in Peoria County, Illinois
Anglican Church in North America church buildings in the United States
Former Episcopal church buildings in the United States
Anglican realignment congregations